The 2023 Women's Twenty20 Cup, known for sponsorship reasons as the 2023 Vitality Women's County T20, is the upcoming 14th edition of the Women's Twenty20 Cup, an English women's cricket Twenty20 domestic competition. It will take place in April and May 2022, with 35 teams taking part, organised into eight regional groups.

Format
Teams play matches within a series of regional divisions, playing three matchdays, with most matchdays consisting of two matches between the same teams. Matches are played using a Twenty20 format. The group stages will be followed by a group Finals Day, to be played on 14 May, with all teams from the group stage qualifying, with first playing fourth and second playing third in the semi-finals.

The groups work on a points system with positions being based on total points. Points are awarded as follows:

Win: 4 points. 
Tie: 2 points. 
Loss: 0 points.
Abandoned/Cancelled: 1 point.

Teams
Teams are divided into eight regional groups. Group 1 consists of 7 teams, whilst Groups 2 to 7 consist of 4 teams apiece. Scotland replace North Representative XI in the only change from the 2022 season.

Standings

Group 1

Group 2

Group 3

Group 4

Group 5

Group 6

Group 7

Group 8

Fixtures
Source:

Group 1

Group 2

Group 3

Group 4

Group 5

Group 6

Group 7

Group 8

References

2023 in English women's cricket
2023 in Scottish cricket
cricket